Quitobaquito Hills is a range of hills in Pima County, Arizona. The name is of Tohono O'odham - Spanish origin meaning 'house ring spring'. Its tallest summit is an unnamed hill  that overlooks Cipriano Pass to the east.

References

Mountain ranges of Arizona
Mountain ranges of Pima County, Arizona
Mountain ranges of the Sonoran Desert
Sonoran Desert
Quitobaquito Springs
Gran Desierto de Altar